Below are lists of action heroes and villains in various media.
List of female action heroes and villains
List of male action heroes and villains